Sihuas may refer to a city, a district and a province in Peru.

For the use of the term in a specific setting, see:

Sihuas, Peru
Sihuas District, Sihuas province.
Sihuas Province, Ancash Region.